Zooarchaeology (sometimes called archaeozoology), also known as faunal analysis, is a branch of archaeology that studies remains of animals from archaeological sites. Faunal remains are the items left behind when an animal dies. These include bones, shells, hair, chitin, scales, hides, proteins and DNA. Of these items, bones and shells are the ones that occur most frequently at archaeological sites where faunal remains can be found. Most of the time, a majority of these faunal remains do not survive. They often decompose or break because of various circumstances. This can cause difficulties in identifying the remains and interpreting their significance.

Zooarchaeology serves as a "hybrid" discipline: combining the studies of archaeology and zoology, which are the study of past human culture and the study of animals respectively. Therefore, zooarchaeologists may also be: anthropologists, paleontologists, archaeologists, zoologists, ecologists, etc. However, the main focus of Zoo-archaeology is to not only find remnants of past animals, but to then identify and understand how humans and their environment (mainly animal populations) coexisted. Zooarchaeology allows researchers to have a more holistic understanding of past human-environment interactions, thus making this topic a sub-field of environmental archaeology. Whether it is diet, domestication, tool use, or ritual; the study of animal remains provides a great amount of information about the groups that interacted with them. Archaeology provides information on the past which often proves invaluable for understanding the present and preparing for the future. Zoo archaeology plays a valuable part in contributing to a holistic understanding of the animals themselves, the nearby groups, and the local environments.

Development
The development of zooarchaeology in eastern North America can be broken up into three different periods. The first being the Formative period starting around the 1860s, the second being the Systematization period beginning in the early 1950s, and lastly the Integration period which began about 1969. 
Full-time zooarchaeologists didn't come about until the Systematization period. Before that it was just a technique that was applied but not specifically studied.

Zooarchaeological specialists started to come about partly because of a new approach to archaeology known as processual archaeology. This approach puts more emphasis on explaining why things happened, not just what happened. Archaeologists began to specialize in zooarchaeology, and their numbers increased.

Uses

One important aspect of zooarchaeology is using morphological and genetic evidence to answer questions zooarchaeologists have about the relationship between animals and humans. These questions include:
 What was the diet like, and in what ways were the animals used for food?
 Which animals were eaten, in what amounts, and with what other foods?
 Who were the ones to obtain the food, and did the availability of that food depend on age or gender?
 How was culture, such as technologies and behavior, influenced by and associated with diet?
How can faunal remains identify social differences such as class or ethnicity?
 What purposes, other than food, were animals used for?
 What was the environment like?
 How did hunter-gatherers collect food? 
 How have human populations changed over time? 
 How have humans domesticated animals over time? 
 How do modern animals compare to animals of the past, and how does this give context to human populations who interacted/still interact with those animals? 
Another important aspect of zooarchaeology is its application to the migration patterns of humans. In areas where people are either closely tied to animal as companions or regularly follow the migrations of herds, the data collected from these animals can help give context to human movement as well. Studying animal remains can also give context to other remains and artifacts found in association with them.

Faunal remains 
Faunal remains are parts of animals that have been left in the material record, which archaeologists study. These remains are important to the record because they can show cultural practices, such as what food they are eating, based on the remains left behind. Zooarcheologists can find out information like the species the animal is, the age the animal was when it died, and what its sex was.

Some common faunal remains found at sites include, as stated above, bones, shells, hair, chitin, scales, hides, proteins and DNA. These are often found in piles of waste that have been left behind. There, as well as in other places, the pieces of bone, scales, teeth, etc. may be mixed together where the archaeologist will have to sort through and identify where the remains came from (what animal/ what species) and where on that species the remain is from. The types of fauna that leave behind these remains will depend on where the archaeological site is located. These animals can be domesticated or wild, and sometimes they find both types of remains at sites.

In addition to helping us understand the past, zooarchaeology can also help us to improve the present and the future. Studying how people dealt with animals, and their effects can help avoid many potential ecological problems. This specifically includes problems involving wildlife management. For example, one of the questions that wildlife preservationists ask is whether they should keep animals facing extinction in several smaller areas, or in one larger area. Based on zooarchaeological evidence, they found that animals that are split up into several smaller areas are more likely to go extinct.

Techniques

Taphonomy
One of the issues to which zooarchaeologists pay close attention is taphonomy. Techniques used in the study of taphonomy include researching how items are buried and deposited at an archaeological site, what the conditions are that aid in the preservation of these items, and how these items get destroyed, all a part of what is referred to by archaeologist Michael Brian Schiffer as behavioral archaeology. One important aspect of taphonomy is assessing how a specimen became damaged; understanding the taphonomy of a faunal assemblage can explain how and why bones were damaged. One source of damage to animal bones is humans. Cut marks on animal bones provide evidence for butchering. Fractures, such as by percussion impact and spiral fracture on a bone can suggest that it was processed by humans for its marrow, minerals, and nutrients. Other human processes that affect bones include burning and damage that occurs during archaeological excavations. Non-human damage to bones includes interspecies damage, damage from raptors, damage from rodents, damage from fungi, environmental weathering, and polishing. Distinguishing different types of damage to animal bones is a tedious and complex process that requires background in multiple scientific fields. Some of the physical damage on bones can be seen with the naked eye, but a lens with 10x magnification and good lighting is necessary for seeing most damage.

Identification and taxonomy
Identification is integral to the archaeological analysis of animal remains. Identification of animal remains requires a combination of anatomy, taxonomy, and studies of archaeological context. The ability to identify a piece of bone requires knowing what element (bone in the body) it is, and to what animal the bone belongs. The latter is referred to as taxonomy, which is used to sort animals into different groups. Zooarchaeology uses Linnean nomenclature, which includes varying degrees of specificity in regards to the species. Linnaean nomenclature (Linnaean taxonomy) is used because it allows archaeologists to identify and show the genetic and morphological relationships between species. These relationships are based on species evolution, which can often be subject to interpretation. While more specific identification is preferable, it is better to be less specific in the identification rather than identify a specimen incorrectly. When examining animal remains, it is common that there are bones that are too small or too damaged to be able to accurately identify it. Archaeological context can be used to help with assumptions about species identification. Skeletal classification is the other half of properly identifying animal remains. Bones can be classified by the material it is made of and by its shape. (7) Three categories of bone shapes include long bones, flat bones, and irregular bones. Bones are structured differently depending on where they are located and what part of the bone it is; the main structural differences are found between spongy bone and compact bone. Spongy bone and compact bone both serve different purposes in regards to bone function; for example, the outside layer of the bone that provides structure is made of compact bone, whereas the inside of the bone is made of spongy bone. The study of bones is useful to zooarchaeology because certain morphological aspects of a bone are associated with particular periods of growth, which can help narrow down the age the specimen was at death. The analysis of teeth require a slightly different approach than bone, but retain the same level of importance when it comes to analysis. The wear pattern and tooth morphology provides information about a species diet and age; the enamel also has biochemical remains of what the animal ate. While animal remains can include more than just bones and teeth, the nature of things like hair and muscle cause it to deteriorate quickly after death, leaving the skeleton behind; this is why most of zooarchaeology revolves around skeletal morphology. Laboratory analysis can include comparing the skeletons found on site with already identified animal skeletons. This not only helps to identify what the animal is, but also whether the animal was domesticated or not.

Genetic analysis
Genetic analysis using ancient DNA is an important tool used by zooarchaeologists. Genetic history of an animal can give information on population movement over time and environmental adaptations necessary to live in an area. It can also give context to how animals may or may not have been domesticated over time by a group of people. Ancient DNA is critical to the genetic analysis of animals remains. Whereas modern DNA has very long fragments in samples, ancient DNA has very short fragments, making it very easily contaminated. The extraction and sampling of ancient DNA requires highly specialized training, as well as intensive protocol to prevent it from being contaminated by modern DNA. The paper :Ancient DNA Analysis of the Oldest Canid Species from the Siberian Arctic and Genetic Contribution to the Domestic Dog" by Lee et al. gives a description of claws and teeth were sampled for ancient DNA. In a facility specially designed for ancient DNA extraction, with the use of personal protective equipment and regular bleaching of surfaces and tools, the claws and teeth were wiped with bleach to destroy all modern DNA on the surface, and were then drilled into a powder. The DNA fragments were extracted from the bone powder using an ancient DNA extraction protocol. After using several processes to replicate the DNA fragments and verify the results (PCR and gel electrophoresis), the ancient DNA from the bone powder was sequenced and then analyzed.

ZooMS
With ZooMS analysis (Zooarchaeology by Mass Spectrometry), the animal species behind a bone fragment or bone artefact can be determined even when no morphological traits survive. The method makes use of interspecies differences in the structure of collagen.

Quantification
Yet another technique that zooarchaeologists use is quantification. They make interpretations based on the number and size of the bones. These interpretations include how important different animals might have been to the diet.

Examples from prehistory 

Human-animal relationships and interactions were diverse during prehistory from being a food source to playing a more intimate role in society. Animals have been used in non-economical ways such as being part of a human burial. However, the majority of zooarchaeology has focused on who was eating what by looking at various remains such as bones, teeth, and fish scales. In the twenty-first century researchers have begun to interpret animals in prehistory in wider cultural and social patterns, focusing on how the animals have affected humans and possible animal agency. There is evidence of animals such as the mountain lion or the jaguar being used for ritualistic purposes, but not being eaten as a food source.

Analyses of faunal remains are important to show how prehistoric and hunter-gatherer civilizations interacted with the animals in their environment. This information can be used to help reconstruct Paleolithic environments. Faunal remains with cut marks, teeth marks, burns, or butchering can signify human interaction which can be important to archaeological data. Sometimes these analyses can be difficult due to decomposition and weathering, which can cause damage to the remains. Not only do faunal remains help reconstruct environments from the past they can show other cultural practices as well. These remains are not always from food, but can be found in jewelry, tools, spiritual practices, and more. This information can show the fauna located in the area of analyses, as well as cultural significance.

Animal burials date back to prehistory with examples emerging from the Mesolithic period. In Sweden at the site of Skateholm I, dogs were found buried with children under eight years old or were found buried by themselves. Some of the dogs who were buried alone have grave goods similar to their human contemporaries such as flint weapons and deer antlers. Meanwhile, during the same time period Skateholm II emerged and was very different from Skateholm I, as dogs were buried along on the North and West boundaries of the grave area. Another burial site in Siberia near Lake Biakal known as the "Lokomotiv" cemetery had a wolf burial among human graves. Buried together with, but slightly beneath the wolf was a male human skull. The wolf breed was not native to this area as it was warm and other research for the area shows no other wolf habitation. Bazaliiskiy and Savelyev suggests that the presence and significance of the wolf could possibly reflect human interaction. Another example occurred in 300 B.C. in Pazyryk known as the Pazyryk burials where ten horses were buried alongside a human male, the horses were fully adorned with saddles, pendants, among other valuables. The oldest horse as also the horse with the grandest attachments. Erica Hill, a professor in archaeology, suggests that the burials of prehistory animals can shed light on human-animal relationships.

Related fields 
Zooarchaeology overlaps significantly with other areas of study. These include:

 Agricultural science
 Anthropology
 Anthrozoology
 Archaeology
 Biology
 Ecology
 Ethnography
 Geology
 Paleopathology
 Palaeontology
 Paleozoology
 Veterinarian
 Zoology

Wider areas of study 
Such analyses provide the basis by which further interpretations can be made. Topics that have been addressed by zooarchaeologists include:

References

Further reading

External links 

 International Council for Archaeozoology (ICAZ)
 ArchéoZoo: collaborative website of archaeozoology (French)
  OpenContext.org (Zooarchaeology data) Multiple zooarchaeological datasets and media published in Open Context.

 
Ethnobiology
Zoology